Asyūṭ Governorate is one of the many governorates of Egypt. It stretches across a section of the Nile River. The capital of the governorate is the city of Asyut.

Etymology
The name of Asyut is derived from early Egyptian Zawty (Z3JW.TJ), late Egyptian Səyáwt into Coptic Syowt. An A was added to the beginning of the name Syowt to become Asyut.

Overview
The rate of poverty in Asyut is more than 60%. Recently, some social safety networks have been provided, in the form of financial assistance and job opportunities. The funding has been coordinated by Egypt's Ministry of Finance, with assistance from international organizations.

Municipal divisions
The governorate is divided into municipal divisions, with a total estimated population of 4,407,335, as of July 2017. In Asyut Governorate, there is 1 new city, three aqsam and eleven marakiz. Sometimes a markaz and a qism share a name.

Population
According to 2015 estimates, the majority of residents in the governorate live in rural areas, with an urbanization rate of only 26.5%. Out of an estimated 4,245,215 people residing in the governorate, 3,119,112 live in rural areas, as opposed to only 1,126,103 in urban areas.

Demographics
Asyut has a population of over 4 million people, with a significant Coptic presence. In 1914, it had the second largest proportion of Copts in Egypt, where they made up 20.7% of the population. However, they now make up 32% while the remaining population are Sunni Muslims. Evangelical (Protestant) religions had significant growth in some districts of Asyut, as evidenced in 1907 census data, where half of the citizens of a village were counted as Protestant Copts. Muslims and Christians have lived together in Asyut and at times there have been clashes. In July 2013, a large number of Christians took to the streets to protest Muslim extremism in Asyut. Whether Christian or Muslim, Asyut is home to a very conservative society and in October, 2016 Upper Egypt's first beauty pageant, which was to be held in Asyut, had to be canceled due to death threats and security issues.

Cities
 Abnub
 Abu Tig
 Asyut
 Dairut
 El Badari
 El Ghanayem
 Manfalut
 El Quseyya
 Sahel Selim
 Sanabo
 Sodfa

Industrial zones
According to the Egyptian Governing Authority for Investment and Free Zones (GAFI), in affiliation with the Ministry of Investment (MOI), the following industrial zones are located in this governorate:
Al Awamer Abnoub 
Al Zarabi in Abu Tig
Al Safa  (Beni Ghaleb)
Sahel Selim 
Dairout 
Badari 
New Asyut

Projects and programs
In 2016, Switzerland committed to funding a solid waste management program in Asyut, a project with the Egyptian Ministry of Environment that will conclude in 2021. The National Solid Waste Management Programme (NSWMP) involves the construction of infrastructure for new as well as the expansion and improvement of existing waste treatment, landfill, and recycling facilities.

Important sites
Ancient quarries are an important feature of Asyut. There are about 500 rock-cut tombs and limestone quarries all around Asyut. The governorate of Asyut includes the Ancient Egyptian tombs of Meir, and the town of Durunka, which is a pilgrimage site for many Copts who come to visit a monastery dedicated to the Virgin Mary.

 Deir El Gabrawi
 Durunka
 Meir

Notable people
 Ahmed Lutfi el-Sayed, Egyptian nationalist.
 al-Suyuti, a Sunni Muslim theologian who died in 1505.
 Akhnoukh Fanous, political activist
 Coluthus, 5th century Greek poet.
 Ester Fanous, female activist

 Gamal Abdel Nasser, Second President of Egypt 
 Hafez Ibrahim, poet born in Dairut, Asyut 
 Ismail al-Qabbani

 Melitius of Lycopolis, founder of the Melitians.
 Mustafa Lutfi al-Manfaluti

Mohamed Mustagab
 Pope Shenouda III of Alexandria, Pope of the Coptic Orthodox Church
 Samir Ghanem, a comedian, singer, and entertainer.

References

External links
 El Wattan News of Asyut Governorate 
 The Middle East and North Africa 
 History Of Egypt, Chaldea, Syria, Babylonia, and Assyria, Vol. 1, by Gaston Maspero, Audiobook

 
Governorates of Egypt
Medieval cities of Egypt
Metropolitan areas of Egypt